Martin Luther was a great enthusiast for music, and this is why it forms a large part of Lutheran services; in particular, Luther admired the composers Josquin des Prez and Ludwig Senfl and wanted singing in the church to move away from the ars perfecta (Catholic Sacred Music of the late Renaissance) and towards singing as a Gemeinschaft (community). Lutheran hymns are sometimes known as chorales. Lutheran hymnody is well known for its doctrinal, didactic, and musical richness. Most Lutheran churches are active musically with choirs, handbell choirs, children's choirs, and occasionally change ringing groups that ring bells in a bell tower. Johann Sebastian Bach, a devout Lutheran, composed music for the Lutheran church: more than half of his over 1000 compositions are or contain Lutheran hymns.

History

Lutheran hymnals include:
 Achtliederbuch, a.k.a. the first Lutheran hymnal (1524). Contains, among others, "Nun freut euch, lieben Christen g'mein", "Es ist das Heil uns kommen her", "Ach Gott, vom Himmel sieh darein", "Es spricht der Unweisen Mund wohl" and "Aus tiefer Not schrei ich zu dir".
 Erfurt Enchiridion (1524)
 Eyn geystlich Gesangk Buchleyn (1524)
 Becker Psalter (1602)
 Praxis pietatis melica (1640/47)
 Neu Leipziger Gesangbuch (1682)

Characteristics

When Johannes Zahn catalogued the tunes of over 8800 Evangelical hymns in the late 19th century, he used the verse characteristics of the lyrics as basis of his classification system.

Hymnodists

Lutheran hymnodists or hymn-writers:

 Martin Behm
 Elisabeth Cruciger
 Simon Dach
 Wolfgang Dachstein
 Paul Eber
 Paul Fleming
 Johann Franck
 Michael Franck
 Paul Gerhardt
 Johannes Gigas
 N. F. S. Grundtvig
 Claus Harms
 Johann Heermann
 Ludwig Helmbold
 Valerius Herberger
 Konrad Hubert
 Justus Jonas
 Christian Keymann
 Balthasar Kindermann
 Johann Kolross
 Martin Luther
 Hemminki of Masku
 Johann Matthäus Meyfart
 Georg Neumark
 Hallgrímur Pétursson
 Christian Heinrich Postel
 Adam Reusner
 Bartholomäus Ringwaldt
 Martin Rinkart
 Johann Rist
 Gottfried Wilhelm Sacer
 Carl Schalk
 Martin Schalling the Younger
 Lazarus Spengler
 Paul Speratus
 Paul Stockmann
 Melchior Teschner
 N. Samuel of Tranquebar
 Jaroslav Vajda
 Michael Weiße
 Catherine Winkworth

Hymnologists
Hymnologists who published on Lutheran hymns:
 Nancy Raabe
 Philipp Wackernagel
 Johannes Zahn

References

Citations

Sources